Jakub Popiwczak (born 17 April 1996) is a Polish professional volleyball player. He is a member of the Poland national team and a silver medallist at the 2022 World Championship. At the professional club level, he plays for Jastrzębski Węgiel.

Career
In 2012, he joined Jastrzębski Węgiel and debuted in the Polish PlusLiga. In 2013, his club won a bronze medal of the Polish Championship. On 23 March 2014, Popiwczak with his teammates beat Zenit Kazan in a match for third place of the 2013–14 CEV Champions League held in Ankara and won the bronze medals. In 2014, he achieved his second bronze medal of the Polish Championship.

Honours

Clubs 
 National championships
 2020/2021  Polish Championship, with Jastrzębski Węgiel
 2021/2022  Polish SuperCup, with Jastrzębski Węgiel
 2022/2023  Polish SuperCup, with Jastrzębski Węgiel

Individual awards
 2022: Polish Championship – Best Receiver

References

External links

 
 Player profile at PlusLiga.pl   
 Player profile at Volleybox.net

1996 births
Living people
People from Legnica
Sportspeople from Lower Silesian Voivodeship
Polish men's volleyball players
Jastrzębski Węgiel players
Liberos